Ivo Bobul (born 1953, Chernivtsi Oblast) is a Ukrainian singer. Bobul won the People's Artist of Ukraine award in 1998.

Biography 
Bobul started as a restaurant singer, before becoming part of the VIA Chernivtsi Philharmonic in 1980. A year later he moved to Live Water, where he replaced his future wife and companion on the stage Liliа Sandulesu.

Bobul was attracted by the composer Alexander Morozov, whom he joined in the composer's music center in Cherkasy. In Cherkasy, he made his first video, Ivo Bobul's Dusi Krinitsa. In 1991, Ivo returned to Chernivtsi and began singing duets with Lilia Sandulesu. In early 1998, Ivo Bobul was awarded the title of People's Artist of Ukraine.

Ivo Bobul became very famous among the youth when the band  Tanok na Maidani Kongo created a sarcastic song Ivo Bobul, where the singer is presented as a superhero. In 2015, Bobul and TNMK performed the song together at a concert in honor of the band's birthday.

References

External links 

 Золотий Фонд української естради
 Збірка інтерв’ю з Іво Бобулом

1953 births
Living people
Soviet pop singers
Ukrainian pop singers
Recipients of the Order of Prince Yaroslav the Wise, 5th class
Recipients of the Order of Merit (Ukraine), 3rd class
Recipients of the title of People's Artists of Ukraine
Recipients of the title of Merited Artist of Ukraine
People from Chernivtsi Oblast
Russian-language singers